Jericho is a 1946 French war film directed by Henri Calef based on Operation Jericho. During the Second World War the Royal Air Force and the French Resistance take part in a joint operation known as "Jericho" to free fifty civilians being held as hostages by the occupying German Army in Amiens.

Cast
 Nadine Alari as Alice Noblet 
 Roland Armontel as Muscat  
 Jean Brochard as Michaud 
 André Carnège as L'aumônier allemand 
 Jacques Charon as Le comte Jacques de Saint-Leu 
 Paul Demange as André Morget  
 Yves Deniaud as Robert Detaille  
 Paul Faivre 
 Guy Favières as Le maire  
 Gabrielle Fontan as Madame Michaud  
 René Génin as Camille Duroc 
 Albert Glado 
 Jacques Henley 
 Maxime Joal 
 Pierre Larquey as Béquille  
 Albert Michel as Le correspondant qui vient de Hollande  
 Henri Nassiet as Le commandant Munchhausen 
 Reggie Nalder
 Line Noro as Rosa Duroc  
 Palau as Dietrich  
 Fred Pasquali 
 Raphaël Patorni as Batignolles  
 Georges Paulais 
 Raymond Pellegrin as Pierre, le fils du pharmacien  
 Raymond Raynal 
 Michel Salina 
 Santa Relli as Simone Michaud  
 Louis Seigner as Le docteur Noblet  
 Robert Seller as Lucien Sampet  
 Pierre Sergeol as L'acteur  
 François Viguier 
 Jean d'Yd as Un conseiller 
 Pierre Brasseur as Jean-César Morin 
 Alfred Baillou 
 Jo Dest as Un policier allemand  
 Rudy Lenoir as Petit rôle  
 Julienne Paroli as La cliente à la pharmacie 
 Howard Vernon as Un officier allemande

References

Bibliography 
 Rège, Philippe. Encyclopedia of French Film Directors, Volume 1. Scarecrow Press, 2009.

External links 
 

1946 films
1940s war films
French war films
1940s French-language films
Films directed by Henri Calef
French World War II films
Films about the French Resistance
French black-and-white films
1940s French films